Mamusta is a village and municipality in the Lankaran Rayon of Azerbaijan. It has a population of 4,402.

References 

Populated places in Lankaran District